Luis Felipe Dias Colares (born 31 March 1994) is a Brazilian mixed martial artist in the Bantamweight division. A professional since 2013, he most notably competed for the Ultimate Fighting Championship (UFC).

Background
Growing up in Macapa, Amapa, Colares started training judo at the age of seven, picking up Brazilian jiu-jitsu, Taekwondo and Muay Thai at 15.

Mixed martial arts career

Early career
Colares compiled an undefeated MMA record of 8–0 fighting within the Brazilian regional MMA circuit culminating with his win of the Jungle Fight featherweight title before signing for UFC in January 2019.

Ultimate Fighting Championship
Colares made his UFC debut at lightweight against Geraldo de Freitas on 2 February 2019 at UFC Fight Night: Assunção vs. Moraes 2. He lost the fight via unanimous decision.

Colares then returned to bantamweight and faced Domingo Pilarte on 20 July 2019 at UFC on ESPN: dos Anjos vs. Edwards. He won the fight via split decision.

Colares then faced Montel Jackson on 25 January 2020 at UFC Fight Night: Blaydes vs. dos Santos. He lost the fight via unanimous decision.

Colares was scheduled to face Gustavo Lopez on 7 November 2020 at UFC Fight Night 182 However, he pulled out of a scheduled bantamweight bout against Gustavo Lopez during fight week as he tested positive for COVID-19.

Colares was initially scheduled to face Journey Newson at UFC on ESPN 23 on 1 May 2021. However, Newson withdrew from the bout and was replaced by Luke Sanders – whose opponent also withdrew from the event – in a featherweight bout on 1 May 2021 at UFC on ESPN 23. Colares was knocked down multiple times in the first round, but won the bout via unanimous decision.

Colares faced Chris Gutiérrez on 9 October 2021 at UFC Fight Night 194. He lost the fight via split decision.

Colares faced Chase Hooper on May 21, 2022 at UFC Fight Night 206. He lost the fight via technical knockout  in round three.

On June 9, 2022 it was announced that Colares was released from the UFC.

Post UFC 
Colares made his first appearance post-UFC release on February 17, 2024 at Ares FC 12, submitting Alioune Nahaye via rear-naked choke in the first round.

Championships and accomplishments

Jungle Fight
 Jungle Fight Featherweight Championship (One time)

Mixed martial arts record

|-
|Win
|align=center|11–4
|Alioune Nahaye
|Submission (rear-naked choke)
|Ares FC 12
|
|align=center|1
|align=center|2:46
|Paris, France
|
|-
|Loss
|align=center|10–4
|Chase Hooper
|TKO (punches)
|UFC Fight Night: Holm vs. Vieira
|
|align=center|3
|align=center|3:00
|Las Vegas, Nevada, United States
|
|-
|Loss
|align=center|10–3
|Chris Gutiérrez
|Decision (split)
|UFC Fight Night: Dern vs. Rodriguez
|
|align=center|3
|align=center|5:00
|Las Vegas, Nevada, United States
|
|-
|Win
|align=center|10–2
|Luke Sanders
|Decision (unanimous)
|UFC on ESPN: Reyes vs. Procházka
|
|align=center|3
|align=center|5:00
|Las Vegas, Nevada, United States
|
|-
|Loss
|align=center|9–2
|Montel Jackson
|Decision (unanimous)
|UFC Fight Night: Blaydes vs. dos Santos
|
|align=center|3
|align=center|5:00
|Raleigh, North Carolina, United States
|
|-
|Win
|align=center|9–1
|Domingo Pilarte
|Decision (split)
|UFC on ESPN: dos Anjos vs. Edwards
|
|align=center|3
|align=center|5:00
|San Antonio, Texas, United States
|
|-
|Loss
|align=center|8–1
|Geraldo de Freitas
|Decision (unanimous)
|UFC Fight Night: Assunção vs. Moraes 2
|
|align=center|3
|align=center|5:00
|Fortaleza, Brazil
|
|-
|Win
|align=center|8–0
|Caio Gregorio
|Decision (unanimous)
|Jungle Fight 92
|
|align=center|3
|align=center|5:00
|Belo Horizonte, Brazil
|
|-
|Win
|align=center|7–0
|Jordano Abdon
|Submission (arm-triangle choke)
|Jungle Fight 86
|
|align=center|3
|align=center|3:25
|Palmas, Brazil
|
|-
|Win
|align=center|6–0
|Thiago Luis Bonifácio Silva
|TKO (retirement)
|Jungle Fight 83
|
|align=center|1
|align=center|2:38
|Rio de Janeiro, Brazil
|
|-
|Win
|align=center|5–0
|Clesio Silva
|Submission (rear-naked choke)
|Max Fight 15: Ilha Comprida
|
|align=center|2
|align=center|4:50
|Ilha Comprida, Brazil
|
|-
|Win
|align=center|4–0
|Eduardo Hanke
|Submission (guillotine choke)
|Talent MMA Circuit 12: Campinas 2014
|
|align=center|1
|align=center|4:14
|Campinas, Brazil
|
|-
|Win
|align=center|3–0
|Eder Costa da Gama
|Submission (guillotine choke)
|North Extreme Cagefighting 12
|
|align=center|1
|align=center|2:18
|Macapá, Brazil
|
|-
|Win
|align=center|2–0
|David William da Silva Farias
|KO 
|ExpoFight Amapá
|
|align=center|1
|align=center|3:10
|Macapá, Brazil
|
|-
|Win
|align=center|1–0
|Evandro Souza Balieiro
|Submission (guillotine choke)
|North Extreme Cagefighting 9
|
|align=center|1
|align=center|N/A
|Macapá, Brazil
|
|-

See also 
 List of male mixed martial artists

References

External links 
 
 

1994 births
Living people
Brazilian male mixed martial artists
Bantamweight mixed martial artists
Mixed martial artists utilizing judo
Mixed martial artists utilizing Muay Thai
Mixed martial artists utilizing taekwondo
Mixed martial artists utilizing Brazilian jiu-jitsu
Ultimate Fighting Championship male fighters
Brazilian practitioners of Brazilian jiu-jitsu
People awarded a black belt in Brazilian jiu-jitsu
Brazilian male judoka
Brazilian Muay Thai practitioners
Brazilian male taekwondo practitioners
People from Macapá
Sportspeople from Amapá